Kök-Janggak (meaning "blue walnut" in Kyrgyz and Uzbek,  Kok-Yangak) is a city in Jalal-Abad Region in western Kyrgyzstan, located at a distance of about 29 km from the regional centre city Jalal-Abad. Its population was 12,117 in 2021. It is a city of regional significance within the Suzak District.

History
Kök-Janggak originated as a coal-mining settlement in 1910. The upper strata of coal of the Kok-Yangak coal deposit were mined on a small scale until the October Revolution. During the Civil War in Russia the mine was destroyed by basmachi and extraction was suspended. During the first five-year plan new drift mines were developed and an access railroad from Jalal-Abad was built in 1931, resulting in a rapid increase in coal production. In 1943 Kök-Janggak became a town.

Population
The population of Kök-Janggak was 10,341 in 2004; including 8,400 - Kyrgyz, 640 - Uzbek, 540 - Russian, 210 - Tatar, 140 - Kazakh, and 411 - other nationalities.

References

External links
 Assessment of the Coal Resources of the Kyrgyz Republic

Populated places in Jalal-Abad Region